Sky King was a 1950s American television drama show.

Sky King may also refer to:

Aviation
 Sky King Airport, in Terre Haute, Indiana
 Songbird Airways, formerly named Sky King
 SkyKing Limited, a defunct airline

People
 Richard "Beebo" Russell of the 2018 Horizon Air Q400 incident
 Muné Tsenpo, Zhangzhung name of the 39th Emperor of Tibet
 Dave Kingman (born 1948), American baseball player

Music
 The Sky Kings, an American country band
 A song from the 1981 album Horrendous Disc by Daniel Amos

Other
Emergency Action Message

See also
 Sky Kingdom, a Malaysian religious commune
 Sky deity